2-Methoxyestrone (2-ME1) is an endogenous, naturally occurring methoxylated catechol estrogen and metabolite of estrone that is formed by catechol O-methyltransferase via the intermediate 2-hydroxyestrone. Unlike estrone but similarly to 2-hydroxyestrone and 2-methoxyestradiol, 2-methoxyestrone has very low affinity for the estrogen receptor and lacks significant estrogenic activity.

See also
 2-Methoxyestradiol
 2-Methoxyestriol
 4-Methoxyestradiol
 4-Methoxyestrone

References

External links
 Metabocard for 2-Methoxyestrone - Human Metabolome Database

Estranes
Ethers
Human metabolites
Ketones
Phenols